Chandgoan Residential Area is one of the major residential area Chittagong in Bangladesh. It's situated at Chandgaon Thana, near a place called "Bahaddarhat". The "কালুরঘাট বেতার কেন্দ্র" is close to this place. Chandgaon Residential Area is fast becoming a commercial zone as a section owners rent out their residential buildings and flats to traders for use for commercial purposes.
Such undesirable phenomenon now poses a threat to the tranquility of life of thousands of residents of Chandgaon - one of the posh residential areas in the port city.

Developed by Chittagong Development Authority (CDA) in 1978, Chandgaon R/A has 663 multi-storied residential buildings on 741 plots in two blocks, sources said.

The peaceful residential character of the area is being spoiled day by day as a section of owners encourage mushroom growth of commercial establishments in violation of law for higher rent, the residents said.

Numerous enterprises, including schools and colleges, health care centres, government and Non-Government Organisations' offices, boutiques, tailoring shops, beauty parlours and drug addicted medication and rehabilitation centres, have been set up in the residential flats and buildings of the area during the last one decade.

Of the educational institutions, Chittagong International School, Chittagong Blooming Buds School, Darul Irfan Academy, City Model School and College, Royal Pre-Cadet School and College, Begum Rokeya School and College, Little Star School, Ananda Multimedia School, Madinatul Ulum AL Islamia, Nurani Alimul Quran Madrasa, International School and College, City Laboratory School and College, Glorious Coaching Centre, Star Fair Teaching Home are prominents ones. Chittagong Education Board is also located here.

The government establishments include Karmajibi Mahila Hostel and Rabindra Sanad Cultural Academy.

Non-government organisations are Integrated Development Foundation (IDF), Young Power in Social Action (YPSA) and Organisation for Women Development in Chittagong (OWDEV).

Addicts' medication and rehabilitation centres, including Tori, Protisruti and Prashanti have also been set up in the residential area having grocery and other shops at almost each and every corner.

The residents said apart from noise of the commercial firms, addicts at the rehabilitation centres and staffs and employees of different offices sometimes make the life unbearable. They are making noise and singing or playing songs in a loud volume throughout the whole day, even in the midnight.

With movement of vehicles and crowd of people all the day and night, we experience an atmosphere of a busy commercial area here, they said.

“A section of owners rent out buildings or flats for commercial use for money ignoring the rules,” said Moinuddin Khokan - a resident of A Block.

Besides, the commercial establishments here are paying bills as per residential rates depriving the government of a huge revenue, he added.

Chittagong Development Authority (CDA) Authorisation Officer Fazlul Karim said setting up of commercial enterprises in the plots of Chandgaon is illegal. He said they have already launched a drive against the practice.

He said they took action against a medicine factory recently for running business at the A-block of the residential area.

"We have also directed estate department to take proper action against owners of the plots and buildings for renting them out for commercial use," Karim added.

References

Neighborhoods in Chittagong